is a Japanese actress and was the wife of Japanese singer Kyu Sakamoto from 1971 until his death in 1985. In the 1970s, Kashiwagi retired from her career as an actress and instead presented a series of welfare performances with her husband in children's homes and nursing homes, and on Japanese television.

Filmography

1970 - ブラボー!若大将 (Toho)
2003 - "Aozora-e-shoot!"
2005 - 少年と星と自転車 "Shonen to hoshi to jitensha"
2009 - The Harimaya Bridge

Television

1966-1967 - これが青春だ(NTV)
1969 - 炎の青春 -(NTV)

Literature

 "Ue wo muite arukou", which reflects on Kashiwagi's husband Kyu Sakamoto and his death. It was published in 1986,

External links
Yukiko Kashiwagi's official homepage

1947 births
Actresses from Tokyo
Japanese film actresses
Japanese television actresses
Living people
20th-century Japanese actresses
21st-century Japanese actresses